Park Sung-Bae is a South Korean football player.

He played for several clubs, including Jeonbuk Hyundai Motors, Gwangju Sangmu Bulsajo (army), FC Seoul, Busan I'Park and Suwon Samsung Bluewings. Also, he played for the South Korea national football team in 1999–2001.

Club career statistics

External links
 
 National Team Player Record 
 New Zealand Football Championship Player Record
 

1975 births
Living people
Association football forwards
South Korean footballers
South Korean expatriate footballers
South Korea international footballers
Jeonbuk Hyundai Motors players
Gimcheon Sangmu FC players
FC Seoul players
Busan IPark players
Suwon Samsung Bluewings players
YoungHeart Manawatu players
K League 1 players
Korea National League players
Expatriate association footballers in New Zealand
South Korean expatriate sportspeople in New Zealand
Sportspeople from North Chungcheong Province